Jana Kulan (née Matiasovska-Aghayeva) (born 7 July 1987) is a Slovak-born Azerbaijani volleyball player for Toray Arrows (women's volleyball team) and the Azerbaijani national team.

She participated at the 2017 Women's European Volleyball Championship.
2018 Women's Volleyball World Championship

References

External links
 

1987 births
Living people
Sportspeople from Bratislava
Slovak women's volleyball players
Azerbaijani women's volleyball players
Slovak emigrants to Azerbaijan
Naturalized citizens of Azerbaijan
Expatriate volleyball players in Turkey
Outside hitters
Azerbaijani expatriate sportspeople in Turkey